The Dutch municipality Rotterdam is divided into districts and neighbourhoods for statistical purposes. The municipality is divided into the following statistical districts:

 District 01 Stadscentrum (CBS-districtcode:059901)
 District 03 Delfshaven (CBS-districtcode:059903)
 District 04 Overschie (CBS-districtcode:059904)
 District 05 Noord (CBS-districtcode:059905)
 District 06 Hillegersberg-Schiebroek (CBS-districtcode:059906)
 District 08 Kralingen-Crooswijk (CBS-districtcode:059908)
 District 10 Feijenoord (CBS-districtcode:059910)
 District 12 IJsselmonde (CBS-districtcode:059912)
 District 13 Pernis (CBS-districtcode:059913)
 District 14 Prins Alexander (CBS-districtcode:059914)
 District 15 Charlois (CBS-districtcode:059915)
 District 16 Hoogvliet (CBS-districtcode:059916)
 District 17 Hook of Holland (CBS-districtcode:059917)
 District 18 Spaanse Polder (CBS-districtcode:059918)
 District 19 Nieuw Mathenesse (CBS-districtcode:059919)
 District 21 Waalhaven-Eemhaven (CBS-districtcode:059921)
 District 22 Vondelingsplaat (CBS-districtcode:059922)
 District 23 Botlek-Europoort-Maasvlakte (CBS-districtcode:059923)
 District 24 Rotterdam-Noord-West (CBS-districtcode:059924)
 District 25 Rivium (CBS-districtcode:059925)
 District 26 Bedrijventerrein Schieveen (CBS-districtcode:059926)
 District 27 Rozenburg (CBS-districtcode:059927)

A statistical district may consist of several neighbourhoods. The table below shows the neighbourhood division with characteristic values according to the Statistics Netherlands (CBS, 2008):

|}

References

Rotterdam
Lists of neighborhoods in Dutch municipalities